Mujtaba Faiz (born 7 November 1982 in Kabul) is an Afghan footballer who plays as a defender for Shaheen Asmayee in the Afghan Premier League.

Career
Faiz plays for Shaheen Asmayee  with shirtnumber 4. He mostly plays as rightback but also can play central defender.

International career
He was selected for the 2014 AFC Challenge Cup in Maldives where he played as a defender with no. 21.

Honours
Shaheen Asmayee F.C.
 Afghan Premier League: 2
 2013
 2014
Afghanistan
 2013 SAFF Championship

References

External links
 
 

1989 births
Living people
Footballers from Kabul
Association football defenders
Afghanistan international footballers
Expatriate footballers in India
Afghan footballers
Afghan expatriate sportspeople in India
Air India FC players
Shaheen Asmayee F.C. players